Survivor Srbija: Panama is a Serbian version of the Survivor television series, created and broadcast by Fox televizija. In addition to Serbia, the show was broadcast in Bosnia and Herzegovina on Alternativna televizija, Macedonia on A1 televizija and Montenegro on TV In.

Featuring 22 contestants (11 men and 11 women), its first season was broadcast starting on October 27, 2008. The show is hosted by Andrija Milošević. The shooting and the competition started on Thursday, July 31, 2008 on location in Panama (Pearl Islands archipelago, 80 km southeast of Panama City).

On October 1, 2008, the filming crew along with the contestants returned to Belgrade after successfully shooting the material. The show's broadcasts started in late October 2008, and finished in mid-February 2009. The show's primetime live televised finale on Wednesday, February 18, 2009 achieved record viewership in Serbia with 2.2 million tuning in (also FOX's record).

Nemanja Pavlov was named the winner in the final episode on February 18, 2009, defeating Radoslav Vidojević and Edita Janečka with a vote of 6-3-0; he won a prize of €100,000 and a Nissan Patrol.

In addition, Nemanja Rosić was named "Public Favourite", earning the fans' vote over Dario Ćirić and Ognjen Janevski. He won a prize of €10,000.

Contestants

The total votes is the number of votes a castaway has received during Tribal Councils where the castaway is eligible to be voted out of the game.  It does not include the votes received during the final Tribal Council.

Two players were eliminated in a tribal selection process. The contestants are told that there were twenty immunity necklaces on the beach; the last two contestants without a necklace would be in danger. Miodrag and Slobodanka were the last contestants, but they had a second chance. The last immunity necklace was in the sea, forcing them to swim for it. They had the opportunity to choose one contestant who would swim instead of them. Slobodanka chose Ognjen, but Miodrag wanted to swim alone. Ognjen won and Miodrag was the first eliminated castaway.

On day 2, the castaways were told they would divide into two tribes of ten members each (five men and five women). Because there were 11 women, one of them would not be chosen, and she would be the second person eliminated. Slobodanka and Tamara were the last unchosen contestants, so Petar had to choose one of them. He chose Tamara, so Slobodanka was the second eliminated castaway.

On day 23, Roca and Armada had the opportunity to choose one woman from the other tribe; Roca chose Edita, and Armada chose Maja. On day 26 Maja and Edita had the opportunity to return to their first tribe. Maja returned to Roca, and Edita returned to Armada.

 Vanja M. experienced an attack of malaria during the last tribal council and she had to leave the game.

 Because Vanja R. played the hidden immunity idol, two votes against her did not count.

The game
Cycles in this article refer to the three-day periods in the game (unless indicated), composed of at least the Immunity Challenge and the subsequent Tribal Council.

In the case of multiple tribes or castaways who win reward or immunity, they are listed in order of finish, or alphabetically where it was a team effort. Where one castaway won and invited others, the invitees are in brackets.

 Through cycle 1 to 9 the challenge was an "Individual Immunity"; through cycle 10 to 16 the challenge was a "Double Vote and Little Reward" and at cycle 17 the challenge was "Place in the Final", where the remaining castaway compete in three final challenges for a place in the final.   
 Combined Reward and Immunity Challenges. 
 Miloš B. gave his immunity to Edita. 
 Miloš T. gave his immunity to Vanja J. 
 Nemanja R. gave his immunity to Maja. 
 There was no reward challenge because of the merge. 
 Hana gave her immunity to Duško. 
 The challenge for Hidden Immunity Idol is active when merged tribe has seven remain castaways from the former Armada tribe. 
 This challenge is not active at cycle 17. 
 Challenges for Hidden Immunity Idol are over.

Voting history
Tribal Council (TC) numbers are almost the same as Cycle numbers as a Tribal Council occurs at the end of each cycle; eliminations that happen outside of a Tribal Council do not bear a Tribal Council number, but count towards a cycle. Episode numbers denote the episode(s) when the voting and subsequent revelation of votes and elimination during a Tribal Council took place. They can also denote the episode wherein a contestant officially left the game for any reason.

 Miodrag was eliminated in a tribal selection process. He lost in the challenge for last immunity necklace, so there wasn't a vote.

 Slobodanka was eliminated irregularly, outside of a Tribal Council. She was not chosen to join any of the new tribes, and thus she was eliminated.

 Vanja M. was evacuated due to medical reasons, and therefore no vote occurred for her removal from the game.

 Maja was voted out on day 38, but because Vanja M. left due to illness, the life (torch) of Vanja M. went to Maja.

 Maja was voted out in the last Tribal Council, but she had a second chance and as a punishment Maja received an extra vote.

 Hana decided to not vote in the Tribal Council, and as a punishment she received an extra vote.

 The public was allowed to award a jury vote to one of the finalists. The public gave one vote for Nemanja P.

Controversy
Before it even started airing, the show aroused some controversy when certain press outlets in Serbia discovered that one of the contestants, 22-year-old Slobodanka "Boba" Tošić, was accused of being an accessory in the attempted murder of gangster Đorđe Ždrale, her ex-boyfriend, that took place on April 13, 2006 in East Sarajevo. Furthermore, information surfaced that there was an arrest warrant issued for her by the Republika Srpska police, which was the reason she moved to Serbia. Her arrest warrant has a central character (as opposed to the worldwide Interpol one), meaning that it is only in effect on the territory of Republika Srpska. The show's producers did not comment on the situation and she was allowed to remain on the show.

She added to the controversy by doing a spread for the Serbian edition of Playboy, which was included in the issue that coincided with the show's launch.

During the live broadcast of the finale, only ten minutes before the winner was announced, Radoslav Vidojević accused fellow finalist Nemanja Pavlov of buying votes from four members of the Tribal Council. Pavlov was announced as the winner irregardless, and the following day it was announced that the producers were suing Vidojević for slander.

References

External links
 Survivor Srbija
 Official site

Serbia
Survivor Srbija
2008 Serbian television seasons
2009 Serbian television seasons
Television shows filmed in Panama